Brampton Township may refer to:
 Brampton Township, Michigan
 Brampton Township, Sargent County, North Dakota

Township name disambiguation pages